The Klimov VK-107 was a V-12 liquid-cooled piston aircraft engine used by Soviet aircraft during World War II.

Development
The VK-107 was developed from the M-105 and VK-106. To achieve a greater power output, each cylinder now had four valves (two intake and two exhaust), crankshaft and camshafts were completely revised, and a new supercharger design was implemented. Although the engine could have been ready for production as early as 1942, the Soviets' factories lacked the capacity to produce a brand new design. Thus, the less powerful Klimov VK-105PF and VK-105PF2 V12 engines were built instead. However, the appearance of Luftwaffe Messerschmitt Bf 109G with Daimler-Benz DB 605 engine in 1943 created an urgent demand for a more powerful engine. VK-107A was put into production in 1944 and was used on Yak-9U fighters. The engine was not well liked by either pilots or mechanics – it had a life expectancy of only 25 hours and war emergency power was almost never used for fear of decreasing this even more. The engine was also difficult to service, in part because its exhaust headers were on the inside of the cylinder banks, the reverse placement of most V-type liquid-cooled engine designs.

Variants
Data from Aircraft engines of the World 1953 and Russian piston aero engines
M-107 (M-107P) Initial designation, produced 1941-1942; 686 built.
VK-107Prototypes with take-off rating of 
VK-107Bwith water injection
VK-107R version for hybrid piston-motorjet powered Mikoyan-Gurevich I-250 (N) and Sukhoi Su-5 fighters
VK-107 coupledA projected coupled powerplant driving contra-rotating propellers
VK-108FBoosted VK-108
VK-109 1945-6 development of the VK-108, planned for use on the Myasishchev VB-109 bomber.

Applications
Mikoyan-Gurevich MiG-7
Petlyakov Pe-2
Yakovlev Yak-3
Yakovlev Yak-9

Specifications (VK-107B)

See also

References

Bibliography

 Gunston, Bill. World Encyclopedia of Aero Engines. Cambridge, England. Patrick Stephens Limited, 1989. 
 Kotelnikov, Vladimir. Russian Piston Aero Engines. Marlborough, Wiltshire. The Crowood Press Ltd. 2005. . 

VK-107
Motorjet engines
1940s aircraft piston engines